Hans Jenny may refer to:

Hans Jenny (pedologist) (1899–1992), soil scientist
Hans Jenny (cymatics) (1904–1972), father of cymatics, the study of wave phenomena

See also
Hans (disambiguation)
Jenny (disambiguation)